Adam & Yves is a 1974 X-rated pornographic film created for gay male audiences. The film is notable for the unauthorized use of footage of Greta Garbo, in what turned out to be the legendary actress's final appearance on film.

Set in Paris during springtime, Adam & Yves follows Frenchman Yves (Marcus Giovanni) and his pursuit of the American tourist Adam (Michael Hardwick). The men have a brief affair, but a long-lasting relationship is prevented by Yves' insistence that they not share personal information.

While making the film, director Peter de Rome reportedly stalked Greta Garbo around New York City, where the retired star was living. After much searching, De Rome located her and was able to shoot footage of Garbo walking across First Avenue. The footage was inserted into Adam & Yves, and its presence was explained by having Adam recalling how he once saw the elusive star.  The Garbo footage was used without the star's knowledge or permission, and she was not paid for her appearance.

See also
 List of male performers in gay porn films
 List of pornographic movie studios

Notes

External links
 
 

1974 films
1970s pornographic films
Gay pornographic films
1974 LGBT-related films
Films set in Paris